Ákos Keller (born 28 March 1989) is a Hungarian professional basketball player for Falco KC Szombathely of the Hungarian Basketball League. Standing at 2.08 m, he plays at the center position.

References

External links
Profile at eurobasket.com

1989 births
Living people
Alba Fehérvár players
Centers (basketball)
Élan Béarnais players
Hungarian men's basketball players
KK Zadar players
Power forwards (basketball)
Śląsk Wrocław basketball players
Sportspeople from Székesfehérvár
Szolnoki Olaj KK players